"Don't Stop" is a song written by Isa Tengblad, Johan Ramström, Gustaf Svenungsson, Magnus Wallin, Oscar Merner, and performed by singer Isa at Melodifestivalen 2015, where it made it to the final, finishing in seventh place. The official music video was released on ISA's YouTube channel on 10 March 2015, where it currently has over 1 million views.

Charts

References

Melodifestivalen songs of 2015
2015 songs
Songs written by Johan Ramström
Isa Tengblad songs
Sony Music singles